The Diocese of Limerick and Killaloe (Full title: The United Dioceses of Limerick, Ardfert, Aghadoe, Killaloe, Kilfenora, Clonfert, Kilmacduagh and Emly) was a former diocese of the Church of Ireland that was located in mid-western Ireland. The diocese was formed by a merger of neighbouring dioceses in 1976, before itself merging with the neighbouring Diocese of Tuam in 2022 to form the Diocese of Tuam, Limerick and Killaloe. 

The diocese was in the ecclesiastical province of Dublin and was one of the twelve Church of Ireland dioceses that cover the whole of Ireland. The diocese covered all of counties Limerick, Kerry and Clare, plus parts of counties Galway, Cork and Tipperary.

Overview and history

After the Church of England and the Roman Catholic Church broke communion, by decree of the Irish Parliament, the Church of Ireland became the independent State Church of the Kingdom of Ireland. It assumed possession of most Church property (and so retained a great repository of religious architecture and other items, though some were later destroyed). The substantial majority of the population remained faithful to Roman Catholicism, despite the political and economic advantages of membership in the state church. The English-speaking minority mostly adhered to the Church of Ireland or to Presbyterianism. Since the formation of the Church of Ireland, it has experienced a continual process of merger of dioceses (see below), in view of declining membership. For this reason, the diocese had three cathedrals.

Predecessor dioceses
Prior to its own merger, the diocese was itself the result of a number of mergers of sees beginning in the seventeenth century:

Cathedrals

 St Mary's Cathedral, Limerick, 
 St Flannan's Cathedral, Killaloe, 
 St Brendan's Cathedral, Clonfert.
Five others are in ruins or no longer exist:
St Brendan's Cathedral, Ardfert was destroyed by fire in 1641
St Alibeus' Cathedral, Emly was demolished in 1877.
Kilmacduagh cathedral, which is partly in ruins
Aghadoe Cathedral, which is partly in ruins
Kilfenora Cathedral, which is partly in ruins, dates from the 12th century.

Parish Groups
The diocese was divided into a number of parish groups.
 Adare Group:  St Nicholas', Adare Croom St Andrew's, Kilfinane St Peter & St Paul's, Kilmallock St Beacon's, Kilpeacon Knockaney.
 Aughrim Group: St Catherine's, Ahascragh Ardrahan Holy Trinity, Aughrim St Matthew's, Clontuskert St John the Evangelist's, Creagh Woodlawn, Kilconell.
 Birr Group: St Brendan's, Birr Dorrha Lockeen St Ruadhan's, Lorrha.
 Clonfert (Cathedral) Group: St Brendan's Cathedral, Clonfert St John the Baptist's, Donanaughta Christ Church's, Lickmolassy St Paul's, Rynagh.
 Cloughjordan Group: Ballingarry Borrisnafarney Borrisokane St Kieran's, Cloughjordan.
 Drumcliffe (Ennis) Group: St Columba, Drumcliffe Kilfarboy St Fachan's, Kilfenora St James', Kilfieragh Kilnasoolagh Christ Church's, Shannon.
 Kenmare Group: St Michael & All Angels', Dromod St Patrick's, Kenmare Church of the Transfiguration, Kilcrohane St John the Baptist's, Valentia.
 Kilcolman (Milltown) Group: St John's, Glenbeigh Kilcolman St Michael's, Killorglin St Carthage's, Kiltallagh Knockane.
 Killaloe (Cathedral) Group: Inniscaltra St Flannan's Cathedral, Killaloe St Senan's, Kiltinanlea All Saints', Stradbally St. Cronan's Church, Tuamgraney.
 Killarney Group: St Mary, Killarney Holy Trinity, Muckross.
 Limerick (Cathedral) Group: St Mary's Cathedral, Limerick Abington St Michael's, Limerick.
 Nenagh Group: Killodiernan St Mary's, Nenagh Templederry.
 Rathkeale Group: St Mary's, Askeaton Kilcornan Kilnaughtin Holy Trinity, Rathkeale.
 Roscrea Group: St Burchin's, Bourney Christ Church's, Corbally St Molua, Kyle St Cronan's, Roscrea.
 Shinrone Group: Aghancon Dunkerrin St Finnian's, Kinnitty St Mary's, Shinrone.
 Tralee Group: Ballymacelligott Ballyseedy St James's, Dingle Kilgobbin, Camp Killiney, Castlegregory St John's, Tralee.
 Plus the University of Limerick.

List of bishops

 Edwin Owen (1976–1981)
 Walton Newcombe Francis Empey (1981–1985)
 Edward Flewett Darling (1985–2000)
 Michael Hugh Gunton Mayes (2000–2008)
 Trevor Williams (2008–2014)
 Kenneth Kearon (2015–2021)

See also
 Dean of Limerick and Ardfert
 Dean of Killaloe and Clonfert
 List of Anglican dioceses in the United Kingdom and Ireland
 Roman Catholic Diocese of Limerick
 Roman Catholic Diocese of Kerry (formerly Ardfert and Aghadoe)
 Roman Catholic Diocese of Killaloe
 Roman Catholic Diocese of Galway, Kilmacduagh and Kilfenora
 Roman Catholic Diocese of Clonfert
 Roman Catholic Archdiocese of Cashel and Emly

References

External links
 Official Website
 Crockford's Clerical Directory - Listings

 
Religion in County Limerick
Religion in County Clare
Religion in County Kerry
Church of Ireland in the Republic of Ireland